Eubranchus leopoldoi is a species of sea slug or nudibranch, a marine gastropod mollusc in the family Eubranchidae.

Distribution
This species was described from Punta Mona, Manzanillo, Costa Rica. It has been reported from the Bahamas.

References

Eubranchidae
Gastropods described in 2001